Ferrol is a city in the Province of A Coruña in Galicia, on the Atlantic coast in north-western Spain, in the vicinity of Strabo's Cape Nerium (modern day Cape Prior). According to the 2021 census, the city has a population of 64,785, making it the seventh largest settlement in Galicia. With Eume to the south and Ortegal the north, Ferrol forms the Ferrolterra comarca, and together with A Coruña forms the second largest conurbation in Galicia, with a total population of 640,000 in 2016.

The harbour, for depth, capacity and safety, is not equalled by many in Europe. The entrance is very narrow, commanded by forts, and may even be shut by a boom.

The city has been a major naval shipbuilding centre for most of its history, being the capital of the Spanish Navy's Maritime Department of the North since the time of the early Bourbons. Before that, in the 17th century, Ferrol was the most important arsenal in Europe. Today, the city contains some of the major shipbuilding yards of the Navantia Group.

As the birthplace of the dictator Francisco Franco in 1892, the municipality was officially named after him as "El Ferrol del Caudillo" from September 1938 to December 1982. It was also the birthplace of the founder of the Spanish Socialist Workers' Party (PSOE), Pablo Iglesias, in 1850.

The city is one of the starting points of the English Way path of the Camino de Santiago. Because of the modern requirement that pilgrims must travel 100 km by foot in order to be officially recognized, Ferrol is the preferred starting point for pilgrims traversing the English Way.

Toponym and etymology
The first historical mention of this settlement, then called Burum as well as Arotebrarum Portum in the history of Pomponius Mela, a Roman historian who wrote in the year AD 43 detailing a description of the Portus Magnus Artabrorum, the "great port of the Artabri". The current toponym Ferrol, though, can only be traced back to the Middle Ages; a document of 1087 instances  sancto Iuliano de Ferrol, nearby the monastery of San Martín de Jubia (12th century, in Romanesque style), where Ferrol is probably the local evolution of the genitive form of the Latin name Ferreolus; Ferrol was probably, in origin, the estate of one Ferreolus. In 1982 the government of Spain adopted officially Ferrol in consonance with its long history and tradition.

Another theory with regards to the etymology of the locative name Ferrol and potential origins is Ferro, Latin for Iron as these parts from Roman times and earlier have been places rich in metals specially Iron and Tin but also Gold and Silver. Possibly, as the bay of Ferrol was such a well guarded port that the old fishing village would have been named after the metal by traders reaching the enclave, in other words: Ferrol.

Alternatively, the name comes from the legend of a Breton saint, Ferreol, who arrived here on a ship, amid a chorus of seven sirens. Another tradition says that Ferrol proceeds from farol, alluding to the heraldic figure that appears on the coat of arms of the city. However, according to experts, the origin of the arms of Ferrol goes back only to the eighteenth century, and there are also several variants used over time, without having been set in accordance with the applicable legislation since the 1990s.  The combination of two words that can mean either 'port – close', 'landing on pillars' or a Ferreoli Domini, "the lord of Ferreol", a veiled allusion to the town, which could have had a church under the patronage of St. Ferreol.

History

The existence of prehistoric human settlements in this Galician city is backed up by the abundance of burial chambers, megalithic monuments as well as Petroglyphs and other archaeological findings. The Phoenicians established in this area different dried and salted cod stations and their presence together with the presence of the Ancient Greeks is well documented by historians like Herodotus, Strabo, Pomponius Mela, just to mention a few classic ones including Ptolemy. In Roman times, in the 1st century BC, a fishing port existed which also trade in metals (like Silver, Gold, Tin and Iron ) as well as wild horses in the bay of Ferrol in the neighbourhood of Nerium there is a place called  Narahio famous for its medieval castle which phonetically resembles a bit Strabo's Nerium modern day Cape Prior in these parts of Iberia dominated in ancient times by the Artabri (or Arrotrebae) giving name to the Portus Magnus Artabrorum  (Form not just by the bay of Ferrol but the three rias of Ferrol, Betanzos and Corunna). Ferrol, was then, just as it is today a first class natural harbour, in the treacherous waters of the Atlantic, very well guarded, not surprisingly, described often in history as the best natural port in Europe.

After the fall of the Western Roman Empire the whole Iberian Peninsula, including Ferrol, was raided by the Vandals and incorporated in 411 to the Suebic Kingdom of Galicia; their kingdom was incorporated in 584 by Leovigild to the Visigothic Kingdom.

After the collapse of the "Suebic-Visigothic state" these Christian parts of Iberia saw very little change, in comparison with other parts of the Iberian peninsula, becoming part of the  Kingdom of Asturias as early as 750AD. A period marked at the beginning with the massive shock and shake, and destruction of one state, followed by the humble-at-first but firm-and-quick rebirth of the "Christian Visigothic State" in the mountains and green pastures of the Atlantic North of the Iberian Peninsula.

Over time, Asturias would split into further Christian kingdoms making these parts to change hands from one monarch to the next: first Galicia, then Leon and finally Castile.
Ferrol served as a strategic safe port during the Hundred Years' War, sided the House of Trastamara during the Castilian Civil War and as a personal reward to Fernan Perez de Andrade, in 1371,  Henry II gave the town to the powerful Andrade family.

In  1568 a fire reduced to rubble the old medieval town; in the same period some parts of the existing fortifications at the entrance of the estuary were built. As a naval base, at that time the town was considered more important as a Royal Arsenal than as a safe harbour.

With the arrival of the Bourbons in the 18th century, Ferrol became a leading naval centre. Ferrol was made Capital of the Maritime Department of the North, formed under Ferdinand VI and Charles III for the defence of the Spanish Colonial Empire in America. Rapid improvements followed, notably under the leadership of the Marquis of Ensenada, and the position of Ferrol was made almost unassailable from the sea, the difficulties of disembarking troops on its precipitous coast being strengthened  by a renewed line of fortresses and newly built castles, including that of San Carlos.

The Royal Dockyards of A Graña and Ferrol (Reales Astilleros de Esteiro), built between 1726–1783, produced ships protected with copper sheets from the rolling mills of Xubia. In 1772, The Spanish Royal Academy of Naval Engineers of Ferrol, the first such academy in Spain, was created. For the most laborious works of the harbour six hundred forced-labour galley-convicts were employed in the harbour.

Ferrol is famous in the history of the struggle between the Spanish Empire and the British for being one of the only enclaves in the world, together with Cartagena de Indias, that always resisted occupation successfully: mostly, because Ferrol was virtually impossible to blockade in the age of sail, as strong westerly winds would take any blockading force away along the treacherous north coast of Spain where they had no safe haven. The geography of Ferrol meant that an entire Spanish fleet could slip out on a single tide. By the time the British were able to resume the blockade, the Spanish would be safely away and out to sea. Despite these advantages, a decline set during the reign of Charles IV, and in 1800, during the Ferrol Expedition (1800), after the defences had been reduced, a British fleet of 109 vessels landed troops on the beach of Doniños to take the Castle of San Felipe. Although only equipped with meagre artillery, the castle's small defence force under the command of Count Donadio together with a sizable number of volunteer citizens of Ferrol, successfully resisted the attack and the fleet withdrew. The alliance with the United Kingdom during the Peninsular War of 1808–1814 failed to prevent the deterioration in the town’s fortunes. The arsenals and fortresses were abandoned and they were easily occupied by the French in 1809.

When the war with Napoleonic France was over, many of the South American colonies chose to break apart from their mother country and the shipyards of Ferrol went into a serious decline losing most of its civilian, clergy and military population, and henceforth, by 1824, Ferrol had a population of just 10,000 civilian and about 6,000 military personnel (stationed locally if not permanently, at least during most of the year) with its mathematical school for marine artillerists, the pilot school, and Academy for the Guardas Marinas almost completely empty in contrast with the glorious years of abundance known before the Battle of Trafalgar in 1805.

Ferrol only built two ships of the line between 1794 and 1845, although nine frigates and a considerable number of smaller warships were also built between these dates. And silent for half a century, it lost its title of capital  under Ferdinand VII. However, there was a massive renovation during Cardinal Alberoni's leadership and in just a few years fourteen great line-of -battle-ships were launched. New activities sprang up and Ferrol was employing 2,000 workmen constantly on its foundries, now in full operation. A School of Naval Engineers was established where 40 pupils were learning the scientific principles of their profession, under a competent staff of instructors bred in England and France. So successful in bringing the worlds most advanced technologies was the administration of the Marquis de Molina, Spanish Minister for Naval affairs, that  by 1858 the Royal Dockyards of Ferrol was launching Spain's first steam propelled ship which was the first iron-hulled too.

The second half of the 19th century brought to the Royal Dockyards of Ferrol not just plenty of work but social and political tensions which ended up in the failed republican uprising of 1872. Steamers between Ferrol and the port of Havana in Spanish Cuba were operating frequently, back then, so, shipyard workers who got themselves into trouble with the local authorities in Ferrol, for one reason or another always thought of the Spanish Main as a possibility.

During this period, same as it is nowadays, and just like it was in the days of the Armada, the Bay of Ferrol always attracted and still attracts numerous ships seeking repairs or refuge after meeting with disaster or rough waters trying to cross the Bay of Biscay on bad weather. Such was the case of Cleopatra, carrying one of the two Cleopatra Needles, the one standing today on the Thames Embankment in London, UK. It  arrived in Ferrol on 19 October 1877 after tragedy and almost sinking off the west coast of France five days earlier. There is a plaque commemorating the event and those who died to be seen at the base of the Needle in London.

Ten years after the Spanish–American War of 1898, in which Spain lost Cuba and the Philippines, the Antonio Maura Government, in an attempt to restore the Spanish Navy and Spanish shipbuilding industry, hired the Spanish Society for Naval Construction, whose major investors were a British-Spanish-Association taking contracts In the following proportions: 40% Vickers Sons and Maxim, 30% Marquis of Comillas of the Spanish Transatlantic Company, 30% Biscay Furnace Company, all the previously state owned shipbuilding yards, workshops, foundries and dry docks at Ferrol were handed over to the technical expertise of some of finest British shipbuilders: John Brown, Vickers and Armstrong now in charge of building the new Spanish Fleet.

For a period of sixteen years, all the technicians were exclusively British, and the situation was not altered till 1925 when the management was taken over by Spanish engineers, as one of the new policies introduced by the then newly created government, including ministers both civil and military, of the dictator Miguel Primo de Rivera (1923–1930). The arrival of the British coincided with the construction of a local electric-powered trolley streetcar's line (1924–1961).

In sight of the outbreak of the Spanish Civil War, and because there was fear of social unrest in the naval station, the Foreign Office in London, organized a ship to repatriate all the remaining British citizens and on 22 July 1936 HMS Witch) departed from Ferrol back to Britain.
At the outbreak of the Spanish Civil War (1936–1939) the shipbuilding yards, workshops, foundries and dry docks in Ferrol were taken over by the state and fully nationalized in 1945 under the name "Bazán", later renamed "IZAR", and, starting from January 2005, Navantia. The town was the birthplace of Francisco Franco, after whom the city was officially known as El Ferrol del Caudillo from 1938 to 1982. The end of the Spanish State and the arrival of democracy in 1978 did not help Ferrol, and from 1982 to the early 1990s, the city confronted numerous problems due to a decline in the naval sector. The beginning of the new millennium however has been a time of economic expansion and prosperity in general. A new motorway and an outer-port have been built as well as numerous arcades and shopping centres mostly in the outskirts of the city between Ferrol and Naron which basically is the same metropolitan area and young shoppers with their families tend to make their big family shopping as well as weekend day out with the family attracted to all the amenities like bowling, cafeterias, fast food outlets, cinemas and sports facilities.

The Spanish Squadron, as always have done from times immemorial, loves taking part in Naval demonstrations and at the beginning of the 21st century Ferrol hosted the large NATO Maritime Exercise Loyal Mariner (RN) back in June 2008.

The Ferrol Terminus railway station, connecting Lugo to Ferrol, branching off from the line from Madrid to nearby Corunna, was sanctioned by the Cortes in Madrid as early as 1865 but it took many decades till its final inauguration in 1904. A century later more of the same happened with the High Speed Railway AVE; so it took as late as 2013 till inauguration day.

From September 2017, a new local railway branch serving the outer-port of Ferrol (known as Canelinas-Ferrol container-port) the inside of the bay docks and the Ferrol Terminus railway station has been given a green light to start constructing and very soon operating I’m sure moving loads of modern containers in and out of Ferrol and distributing goods throughout Galicia and the rest of Spain and Europe. There was a similar small railway local branch operating here from the early years of the 20th century with the difference that at that time, Ferrol itself and its ports were intended solely for the Royal Navy and its shipyards, and henceforth not open to the general commerce per se,  even though, historically, there have been many local exceptions like; PEMSA (Timber), PYSBE (Dry-Cod) and HISPANIA (Pencils) all three very good examples without forgetting: manufactures of hats, paper, leather, naval stores and hardware as well as other local items for export like: corn, wine, brandy, vinegar, pilchards and herrings (and other produce of Ferrol's own fisheries)

Climate
As in most of Galicia, Ferrol climate is a humid oceanic climate, characterised by year-long mild temperatures, rainy winters, and relatively dry summers, although slightly wetter than the typical Spanish mediterranean climate during the summer season.

Demography 
Histogram of population evolution of Ferrol from 1877. (From: Censos de población INE )

Economy
 Primary Industries – Agriculture (Horse Breeding), Aquaculture (Fish Farming), Fishing (Specializing in the Atlantic Shoals), Important Mines (ENDESA), NTFPs (Forestry), Quarries and Timber.
 Secondary Industries – Shipbuilding, Ship Engines, Turbines (Wind Mills and Ships), Electrical Equipment, Ironworks, Fashion (Textiles), Food (Canned Fish) and Wood-Made Products.
 Tertiary Industries – Mercantile, Fishing and Military Ports, Restaurants, News Media (Ferrol TV/Diario de Ferrol), Hotels (Barceló Almirante/Pazo Libunca), Leisure and Tourism (World Surf Competitions,  Popular Transatlantic Steamships Stop), Consulting, Health Care/Hospitals (Arquitecto Marcide Hospital Complex), Education (Schools, Colleges/ESENGRA and Universities/UNED/PERITOS) and Public Utilities, Franchises (main brand names and designer label's shops), Wholesale (Navy Suppliers/Anton-Martin) and Retail Industries (El Corte Inglés/Alcampo).
 Quaternary Sector Industries – Naval, Electrical and Mechanical Equipment together with New Technologies.

Festivals

International relations

Twin towns – Sister cities
Ferrol is twinned with:

 Lugo, Spain, since 2000
 Mondoñedo, Spain, since 2004
 Adelaide, Australia, since 2010
 Vila do Conde, Portugal, since 1973

Notable people
 Alonso Pita da Veiga
 Andrés Suárez, singer-songwriter
 Ángeles Alvariño Gozález (1916–2005), biologist and oceanographer (1916–2005)
 Benito Vicetto Pérez (1824–1878), writer
 Carlos Jean (born 1973), electronic musician and music producer
 Concepción Arenal (1820–1893), writer, feminist activist
 Fernando Álvarez de Sotomayor y Zaragoza (1875–1960), painter
Francisco Franco (1892–1975), dictator of Spain from the Spanish Civil War (1936–1939) to his death.
 Frederick H. Shaw (1864–1924)
 Gonzalo Torrente Ballester (1910–1999), writer
 Ignacio Fernández Toxo (born 1952), ex general secretary of the national union CCOO and President of the ETUC
 Jenaro Pérez Villaamil (1807–1854), painter
 Jesús Vázquez Martínez (born 1965), TV presenter
 José Canalejas Méndez (1854–1912), former Spanish Prime Minister died in office
 María Isabel Rivera Torres (born 1952), actress
 Marquis of Amboage (1823–1892), multimillionaire and politician
 Nacho Novo (born 1979), professional footballer
 Pablo Iglesias Posse (1850–1925), politician and founder of Spanish socialist party PSOE
 Paloma Pérez-Lago González (born 1967), fashion model and TV presenter
 Patricio Montojo y Pasarón (1839–1917), Spanish admiral during the Spanish–American War who was defeated at the Battle of Manila Bay
 Paula Vázquez Picallo (born 1973), TV presenter and model
 Ramón Franco (1896–1938), aviator and brother of Francisco Franco
 Ricardo Carvalho Calero, first ever professor of Galician literature and Linguistics – University of Santiago de Compostela (1910–1990)

See also

 El Casino de Ferrol
 El Circulo Mercantil de Ferrol
 El Club Naval de Ferrol
 El Correo Gallego
 El Diario de Ferrol
 El Ferrol Diario
 Endesa Termic
 Racing Club de Ferrol
 School of Peritos Navales and Industriales
 Sociedad Española de Construcción Naval
 Spain's National Exhibition of Ship Building

Notes

External links

  
 Green Tourism in Northern Spain 2005
 Site devoted to the art of landscape and nature of Ferrolterra 
 When I Was a Child in Ferrol, Spain (1953–65)

 
Municipalities in the Province of A Coruña
Port cities and towns on the Spanish Atlantic coast
Populated coastal places in Spain
Spanish Navy